The Master Key System is a personal development book by Charles F. Haanel (1866–1949) that was originally published as a 24-week correspondence course in 1912, and then in book form in 1916.  The ideas it describes and explains come mostly from New Thought philosophy. It was one of the main sources of inspiration for Rhonda Byrne's film and book The Secret (2006).

General description
The book describes many New Thought beliefs such as the law of attraction, creative visualization and man's unity with God, and teaches the importance of truth, harmonious thinking and the ability to concentrate. Each of the 24 chapters contains an introduction, followed by a sequentially numbered section which includes an exercise towards the end, followed by a section with questions and answers. At the beginning of the book is a Psychological Chart which readers are encouraged to complete, providing a self-evaluation of their creative power, time efficiency, health, mental ability and capacity to concentrate. The book ends with a glossary and general question-and-answers section. Every chapter includes a quotation from people such as Jonathan Edwards, Lilian Whiting and Amos Bronson Alcott.

Exercises
Each chapter ends with an exercise which the reader is encouraged to undertake every day for the following 4–7 days. The exercises are meditations that require the reader to first sit comfortably in a chair.

The sequence of exercises in each chapter is as follows:
 Sitting still
 Inhibiting all thought combined with previous exercise
 Releasing physical tension combined with previous exercises
 Letting go of all negative emotions combined with previous exercises
 Visualising a pleasant place
 Remembering details from a photo of someone
 Visualising positive facial expressions on the face of a friend
 Visualising everything that leads to the construction of a battleship
 Visualising a flower growing from seed
 Visualising certain geometric forms
 Concentrating on a quote from the Bible; Mark 11:24
 Contemplating your unity with Omnipotence
 Contemplating being part of the Whole
 Focusing on harmony
 Contemplating the fact that knowledge needs to be applied to be useful
 Contemplating that happiness and harmony are states of consciousness
 Focusing on the object of your desire
 Focusing on your power to create – create a logical basis for your faith
 Total concentration on what you want
 Focusing on "In Him we live and move and have our being"
 Focusing on truth 
 Concentration on a Tennyson quote: "Speak to Him, thou, for He hears, and spirit with spirit can meet, Closer is He than breathing, and nearer than hands and feet."
 Contemplating the fact that man is a spirit with a body
 Realising that this is a wonderful world

Themes
The ideas behind the book mainly come from New Thought philosophy, but there are influences from other sources such as Hinduism, Masonism and Rosicrucian teachings, Theosophy, and the Bible.

Influence
Along with The Science of Getting Rich, by Wallace D. Wattles, The Master Key System inspired much of the content of Rhonda Byrne's film The Secret (2006), which was later followed by a book of the same name.

It is claimed on the website haanel.com that Charles Haanel received a letter in 1919 from Napoleon Hill, who later went on to write one of the best-selling books of all time, Think and Grow Rich, saying that his own success was due to the principles laid down in The Master Key System.

Terry Crews has described The Master Key System as his favorite book among hundreds of personal development books, saying that it showed him "how to visualize, contemplate, and focus on what I really wanted" and that he rereads it "probably once a month to keep my vision clear".

Variations
There are many editions of the book. Modern editions mostly do not include the three-part introduction, the psychological chart, the question-and-answers section at the end of the book, or the glossary. Some modern editions also include 4 additional chapters which come from chapters 11-14 of another book Haanel wrote called A book about you. The first British Empire edition, printed in 1933 by The Master Key Publishing Company, is called The Master Key with no mention of the word "system".

Quotations
The book contains many quotations. Some are printed at the end of chapters while others are in the main body of the text. This list shows all the people quoted in the 1919 edition, and the chapter or part of the book in which the quotes are found. Some editions arrange the quotations in slightly different orders and some have quotes that do not appear in the 1919 edition; for example, many have a quote by Benjamin Disraeli at the end of chapter 23.

 Seneca, Introduction
 James J. Hill, Introduction
 Elbert Gary, Introduction
 Walter Colton, 1
 Professor Davidson, 2
 James Allen, 2,7
 Prentice Mulford, 2,16
 Thomas Troward, 3
 Ralph Waldo Emerson, 3,5,10,17 & 19
 Walker, 3
 Herbert Spencer, 4
 Lyman Abbott, 4
 Helen Wilmans, 4
 Christian D. Larson, 6
 William Shakespeare, 6
 Nikola Tesla, 7
 George Matthew Adams, 8,14
 Kālidāsa, 8
 Frederick Andrews, 9
 James McCosh, 9
 A. B. Alcott, 9
 Henry Drummond, 10
 Thomas Huxley, 10
 John Tyndall, 10
 Lillian Whiting, 10
 Floyd Baker Wilson, 12
 Herbert Kaufman, 13
 Benjamin Franklin, 13
 Charles Mackay, 13
 Jacques Loeb, 15
 Horatio Bonar, 15
 Henry Flagler, 16
 H. W. Beecher, 16
 William Dunkerley, 16
 Christian Bovee, 17
 John Ambrose Fleming, 18
 G. A. Sala, 18
 Marcus Antonius, 18
 South, 19
 Johann Lavater, 20
 Johann Goethe, 20
 Orison Swett Marden, 21
 Frank Haddock, 21
 Alfred T Shofield, 22
 Alfred Tennyson, 22
 Alexander Pope, 22
 William Channing, 22
 William Walker Atkinson, 23
 Francis Larimer Warner, 23
 Samuel Smiles, 24
 Isaac Funk. Glossary
 Alexander Winchell. Glossary
 G. C. Robertson. Glossary
 William Inge. General questions & answers
 Jonathan Edwards. General questions & answers
 Joseph Joubert. On 'Go Slow' page, printed 12 times throughout book.

In addition to these quotations, the book quotes the Bible 23 times.

Derivative works
 Abundance and Prosperity - The Master Key System Decoded, by Prof. C. W. Haanel Mentz  
 The Electronic Master Key System in 24 Parts - Re-Edited, by Anthony R. Michalski.
 Master Key Arcana, by Anthony R. Michalski.
 Master Key System (28 Part Complete Deluxe Edition) - Ishtar Publishing (July 2007) 
 The Master Key System 2012 Centenary Edition, edited, illustrated and annotated by Helmar Rudolph (January 2011) .
 Tapping the Source (2010), by William Gladstone, Richard Greninger, John Selby and Jack Canfield,
 The Master Key System Summarized & the Science of Getting Rich Decoded, by George Mentz.
 Masters of the Secrets Expanded, by Wallace Wattles, Charles Haanel, Thomas Troward, C. Wattles Haanel Mentz.

Other books by Haanel
Note, Master Key System and Mental Chemistry, being published prior to 1923, are considered to be in public domain, but several of his other books, being currently in distribution, are still covered by copyright law timeframe.

Mental Chemistry
The New Psychology
A book about You
The Amazing Secrets of the Yogi

External links
 The Master Key System, in free weekly lessons, Psi-Tek

References

New Thought literature
Self-help books
1912 non-fiction books
1916 non-fiction books